Valentina Caniglia is an Italian-American cinematographer and director, who has received awards for her work. She is a member of the Italian Society of Cinematographers (AIC) and European Federation of Cinematographers (IMAGO).

Early life and education
Caniglia was born in Naples, Italy. When she was seven years old, her father bought her a Kodak film stock camera. She became interested in cinematography at the age of eight when her father showed her films like The Conformist (il Conformista) directed by Bernardo Bertolucci, The Godfather directed by Francis Ford Coppola, Blade Runner directed by Ridley Scott, Wings of Desire directed by Wim Wenders, Farewell my concubine directed by Chen Kaige, and Seven Samurai directed by Akira Kurosawa. 

She moved to London to begin a career as a cinematographer. Then, she moved to New York City on a fellowship. She graduated from New York University with a Bachelor of Arts in Film Production and began work in feature films, TV series, commercials, music videos and documentaries.

Career

Caniglia is known for her lighting and camera work on movies, TV series, commercials, music videos like The Stand. For her work on the period film Madeline's Oil, she won Best Cinematography award at the Louisiana International film festival. She worked on the film Pomegranates and Myrrh, winner of the Golden Dagger at the Muscat Film Festival for Best Cinematography. The film premiered at the Sundance Film Festival, and received the Best Film Award at Doha Tribeca Film Festival. Among other films Caniglia worked on Soyka two times winner for best cinematography award at New York Cinematography awards, Canadian Cinematography awards ; Fire In Water where Valentina won the best cinematography award at Los Angeles film festival and was included in the Teen Vogue article among the cinematographers behind some of the biggest movies awards; 

Among the notable works by Valentina Caniglia are Without Grace starring Emmy Award winner Ann Dowd, the cinematography work for 3 Days Rising starring Mickey Rourke, Ice-T, Peter Greene, a black and white film Adieu Lacan starring David Patrick Kelly, Tape directed by Deborah Kampmeier (Clarice, Queen Sugar, Tales of the Walking Dead, Virgin, Hounddog) starring Isabelle Fuhrman, and her cinematography on the video "Stand for a Change" starring Vanessa Williams and Billy Porter. 

Valentina's cinematography is shown at the Apple TV series Dear X S2 starring Viola Davis, Ava DuVernay, Jane Fonda, Sandra Oh, André Leon Talley, Selena Gomez and the latest TV series The Captain directed by Randy Wilkins 7 Executive Producers by Spike Lee, Mike Tollin (Eureka Entrainment) 

Caniglia's lighting and camera work can also be seen as an additional Cinematography on the Original Netflix series Gypsy starring Naomi Watts.

Caniglia was recently selected by the ASC vision committee to receive the prestigious ASC Vision Mentorship Award program

Caniglia directed The Amytal Therapy which was nominated for best director at the Chelsea film festival and London International film festival.

Caniglia has worked as a cinematographer for HBO, Netflix, Voyage TV Showtime.  She has filmed numerous nationally aired commercials for British Airways, Ford Motor Company, Nike, GBX Shoes, which received the Telly Award. Caniglia has worked on music videos for Aesop Rock, which was number one on MTV's top ten chart ; Enzo Gragnaniello; The Roots; Articolo 31, and The Stein.

References

Further reading

External links

American film directors
American women cinematographers
American cinematographers
American women film directors
Living people
English-language film directors
Year of birth missing (living people)
21st-century American women